The county of Derbyshire is divided into nine districts. The districts of Derbyshire are High Peak, Derbyshire Dales, South Derbyshire, Erewash, Amber Valley, North East Derbyshire, Chesterfield, Bolsover, and Derby.

As there are 460 Grade II* listed buildings in the county they have been split into separate lists for each district.

 Grade II* listed buildings in Amber Valley
 Grade II* listed buildings in Bolsover (district)
 Grade II* listed buildings in Chesterfield
 Grade II* listed buildings in Derby
 Grade II* listed buildings in Derbyshire Dales
 Grade II* listed buildings in Erewash
 Grade II* listed buildings in High Peak
 Grade II* listed buildings in North East Derbyshire
 Grade II* listed buildings in South Derbyshire

See also
 Grade I listed buildings in Derbyshire

See also
 :Category:Grade II* listed buildings in Derbyshire

References
National Heritage List for England

 
Lists of Grade II* listed buildings in Derbyshire